is a museum of contemporary art located in Sapporo, Japan, that was established in April 2006 and is now closed.

Presentation 
The Miyanomori Art Museum is the main contemporary art museum in Hokkaido. It presents works from the contemporary international and Japanese art scene.

Collection 
The collection features works of Japanese modern and contemporary art from the 1950s to the 1970s. From the Museum own estimation, it also has the largest collection of works by Christo and Jeanne-Claude in Asia and Oceania.  The museum collection also includes about 3000 photographs from the artist Daidō Moriyama, which were taken since the 1950s, as well as works by such artists as Lucio Fontana, Frank Stella, Jasper Johns, Yoshishige Saitō, Lee Ufan, Guillaume Bottazzi, Sadamasa Motonaga, Takeo Yamaguchi, and Kumi Sugai.

Exhibitions 
 Christo and Jeanne-Claude — 2006–2007 — Retrospective.
 Kenji Yanobe — 2007 — Exhibition
 :ja:榎忠 Chu Enoki — 2008 — Exhibition.
 Daido Moriyama — 2009 — Exhibition
 Guillaume Bottazzi — 2011 — Exhibition and permanent site-specific art work, 900 m² on the museum.

Editions 
 MORIYAMA Daido NORTHERN. Production: Miyanomori Art Museum. Editor: Akio Nagasawa Publishing. 2009, single print, 24 pages, limited edition (2,000 exemplary). Size: In-folio (54.5 × 40.5 cm).
 CHRISTO / JEANNE-CLAUDE. Works and Projects 1958–2006. Production: Miyanomori Art Museum, 2006. Editor: SAPA. 52 pages. Size : (21 × 30 × 0.5 cm).
 MORIYAMA Daido NORTHERN2. Production: Miyanomori Art Museum. Editor: Akio Nagasawa Publishing. 192 pages, Size: A4. 2010.
 MORIYAMA Daido NORTHERN3. Production: Miyanomori Art Museum. Editor: Akio Nagasawa Publishing. 2011.

References

External links 
 Miyanomori Art Museum website

Art museums established in 2006
2006 establishments in Japan
Contemporary art galleries in Japan
Art museums and galleries in Hokkaido
Museums in Sapporo
Buildings and structures in Chūō-ku, Sapporo